The following is a list of films featuring association football.

List

See also
List of sports films
List of highest-grossing sports films

References

Association football
Films